In Her Own Words is an American rock band from Los Angeles, California.

History
In Her Own Words released their first EP in 2011 titled Brand New Me. In 2013, the band released their first full-length album on Ice Grill$ titled Everything I Used To Trust. In 2016, In Her Own Words signed to InVogue Records and released their second full-length album titled Unfamiliar. Currently, In Her Own Words is signed to Thriller Records and have released their third full-length studio album Distance Or Decay.

Band members
Joey Fleming (vocals)
Ian Berg (guitar)
Eric Ruelas (bass)
Omar Sultani (drums)
Andretti Almalel (guitar)

Discography
Studio albums
Unfamiliar (2016, InVogue)
Steady Glow (2019, InVogue)
Distance Or Decay (2022, Thriller)
EPs
Brand New Me (2010)
Everything I Used To Trust (2013)
Bad Weather (2015)
Singles
East & West (2014)
Strangers (2014)
Bad Weather (2015)
Leaving Forever (2021)
Lights Out (2022)
Raining In Toronto (featuring Johnathan Vigil (2022)
Circles (featuring Derek Discanio) (2022)
Daydream (2022)
Compilation Appearances
Happy Holidays, I Miss You - Yule Shoot Your Eye Out (Fall Out Boy cover)

References

Musical groups from Los Angeles